Enyo is an open source JavaScript framework for cross-platform mobile, desktop, TV and web applications emphasizing object-oriented encapsulation and modularity. Initially developed by Palm, which was later acquired by Hewlett-Packard and then released under an Apache 2.0 license. It is sponsored by LG Electronics and Hewlett-Packard.

Bootplate 
Bootplate is a simplified way of creating an app, providing a skeleton of the program's folder tree. The Bootplate template provides a complete starter project that supports source control and cross-platform deployment out of the box. It can be used to facilitate both the creation of a new project and the preparation for its eventual deployment.

Libraries
Layout: Fittables, scrollers, lists, drawers, panels.
Onyx: Based on the original styled of webOS/Touchpad design but available for use on any platform.
Moonstone: Used by LG SmartTV apps but available for use on any platform.
Spotlight: To support key-based interactions and "point and click" events on remote controls and keyboards.
Mochi: Advanced user interface library. It has been maintained by the community since the team behind webOS released this abandoned interface from Palm/HP as open source. This library  is not included on bootplate right now, but has design documents.
enyo-iLib: Internationalization and localization library, it wrap ilib's functionality on Enyo apps. G11n was another library that has been deprecated on newer versions of enyo.
Canvas
Extra
enyo-cordova: Enyo-compatible library to automatically include platform-specific Cordova library (WIP).

Use
The following projects are built with Enyo:

 LG Smart TV apps. 
 Openbravo Mobile and Web POS.
 xTuple ERP Web and Mobile App.

Partial list of Enyo apps can be found on Enyo Apps. Some developers can be found on Enyo Developer Directory.

Examples 
This is an example of a 'Hello world program' in Enyo
enyo.kind({
  name: "HelloWorld",
  kind: enyo.Control,
  content: 'Hello, World!',
});

new HelloWorld().write();

Supported platforms 
In general, Enyo can run across all relatively modern, standards-based web environments, but because of the variety of them there are three priority tiers.  At 2015 some platforms supported are:
Tier 1 Supported at high priority:
Packaged Apps: iOS7, iOS6 (PhoneGap), Android 4+ (PhoneGap), Windows 8.1 Store App and Windows Phone 8 (PhoneGap), Blackberry 10 (PhoneGap), Chrome Web Store App, LG webOS.

Desktop Browsers: Chrome (latest), Safari (latest MAC), Firefox (latest), IE11 IE10, IE9, IE8. (Win).

Mobile Browsers: iOS7, iOS6, Android 4+ Chrome, Kindle Fire and HD,  Blackberry 10, IE11 (Windows 8.1),IE10 (Windows Phone 8).
Tier 2 Supported
Packaged Apps: iOS5, iOS4, Android 2.3,Firefox OS (pre-release), Tizen OS (pre-release), Windows 8 Store App, Windows (Intel AppUp).

Desktop Browsers: Opera, Chrome >10, Firefox >4, Safari >5.

Mobile Browsers: iOS5, iOS4, Android 4+ Firefox, webOS 3.0.5, webOS 2.2, BlackBerry 6-7, BlackBerry Playbook and others.

Tier 3 Partial support
Mobile Browsers: Windows Phone 7.5.

No support
Desktop Browsers: IE8

Mobile Browsers: Windows Phone 7, BlackBerry 6, Symbian, Opera Mini

Versions

See also

 PhoneGap
 Yeoman.io
Backbone.js
React (JavaScript library)

References

External links
 

Android (operating system) development software
BlackBerry development software
Integrated development environments
JavaScript libraries
Television technology